Achieve (formerly known as FreedomPlus) is a lender that mainly focuses on underwriting loans to prime consumers. Achieve is the consumer brand of Freedom Financial Network, LLC, which is headquartered in San Mateo, California. Achieve developed a proprietary underwriting process that delivers low-cost loans to borrowers and low-risk access to consumer loan portfolios for accredited investors.

In December 2013, the Freedom Financial Network announced it received a venture capital commitment of $125 million from Vulcan Capital, which is Vulcan Inc.'s investment company. Freedom Financial Network will use the capital to grow its lending operations and to launch FreedomPlus, an online lending platform. FreedomPlus is open to accredited investors to invest in pools of loans, but it is not a peer to peer lending company.

FreedomPlus was previously led by Joseph Toms (President J.G. Wentworth), the former managing director at LC Advisors, Lending Club’s registered investment advisor subsidiary, and Chief Investment Officer at Prosper Marketplace. Both are peer-to-peer lenders.

FreedomPlus will focus on “emerging prime” borrowers with FICO scores between 620 and 749, of which there are 80 million in the US. The maximum loan amount will be $40,000 and the maximum interest rate will be less than 29.99%, with flexible loan terms of two, three, four or five years.

The company will use traditional underwriting tools, such as credit scores, when underwriting loans. It will also use a significant human component and talk with borrowers to verify information and understand the goals they wish to accomplish with the loan, to try to find loans that fits borrowers' specific needs.

History
Inception
The parent company of FreedomPlus, Freedom Financial Network, started a pilot program in 2008 that made unsecured loans to consumers struggling with their existing debt. The company lent $25 million to people who had average FICO scores of 576. Average loan balances were greater than $15,000, and annual default rates were less than 2%. Interest rates are 3.75% above prime consumer debt rates.

Name Change
In November 2022, FreedomPlus changed its name to Achieve.

Leadership 
 Andrew Housser, Co-CEO and Co-Founder
 Bradford Stroh, Co-CEO and Co-Founder

See also
 Alternative financial services
 Non-bank financial institution

References

External links 
 
 

Companies based in San Mateo, California
American companies established in 2013
Credit